Cold Spring Bridge is a historic concrete open-spandrel arch bridge located at Whitehall Township and North Whitehall Township in Lehigh County, Pennsylvania. The bridge was built in 1930, and is a  bridge, with a single  arch consisting of six symmetrically placed spandrel arches.  It crosses Spring Creek.

It was listed on the National Register of Historic Places in 1988.

In 2014 the bridge was considered to be structurally deficient and scheduled to be replaced by a three span bulb T-beam bridge costing $3.8 million.  It had an average daily traffic volume of 2,461 vehicles.

References 

Road bridges on the National Register of Historic Places in Pennsylvania
Bridges completed in 1930
Bridges in Lehigh County, Pennsylvania
National Register of Historic Places in Lehigh County, Pennsylvania
Concrete bridges in the United States
Open-spandrel deck arch bridges in the United States